William Henry Pratt (23 November 1887 – 2 February 1969), known professionally as Boris Karloff, was an English actor. His portrayal of Frankenstein's monster in the horror film Frankenstein (1931) (his 82nd film) established him as a horror icon, and he reprised the role for the sequels Bride of Frankenstein (1935) and Son of Frankenstein (1939). He also appeared as Imhotep in The Mummy (1932), and voiced the Grinch in, as well as narrating, the animated television special of Dr. Seuss' How the Grinch Stole Christmas! (1966), which won him a Grammy Award.

Aside from his numerous film roles (174 films), Karloff acted in many live stage plays and appeared on dozens of radio and television programs as well. For his contribution to film and television, Karloff was awarded two stars on the Hollywood Walk of Fame on 8 February 1960.

Early life

William Henry Pratt was born on 23 November 1887, at 36 Forest Hill Road, Dulwich, Surrey (now in London), England. His parents were Edward John Pratt (1826/7–1897), of the Indian Civil Service, where he worked for the salt revenue service, and Eliza Sara (born 1848), née Millard. Both his parents died when Karloff was young, and he was primarily raised by a half-sister and his elder siblings. His brother, Sir John Thomas Pratt, was a British diplomat. Karloff's father Edward John Pratt was Anglo-Indian, with a British father and Indian mother, meaning that Karloff was at least a quarter Indian, while Karloff's mother also had some Indian ancestry, thus Karloff had a relatively dark complexion that differed from his peers at the time. His mother's maternal aunt was Anna Leonowens, whose tales about life in the royal court of Siam (now Thailand) were the basis of the musical The King and I. Pratt was bow-legged, had a lisp, and stuttered as a young boy. He learned how to manage his stutter, but not his lisp, which was noticeable throughout his career in the film industry.

Pratt spent his childhood years in Enfield, in the County of Middlesex. He was the youngest of nine children, and following his mother's death was brought up by his elder siblings. After first attending Enfield Grammar School, he received a private education at Uppingham School and Merchant Taylors' School. Following this he attended King's College London, where he took studies aimed at a career with the British Government's Consular Service. However, in 1909, he left university without graduating and drifted, departing England for Canada, where he worked as a farm labourer, truck driver and did various odd jobs until happening upon stage acting, which led to a later film career. He also worked for BC Hydro Electric in Canada.

Canadian and U.S. stage work 

Pratt began appearing in theatrical performances in Canada in 1911 and during this period he chose Boris Karloff as his stage name. Karloff always claimed he chose the first name "Boris" simply because it sounded foreign and exotic, and that "Karloff" was a family name. Karloff's daughter, Sara, publicly denied any knowledge of Slavic forebears, "Karloff" or otherwise.

It has been speculated by film historians that he took the stage name from a mad scientist character named "Boris Karlov" in the novel The Drums of Jeopardy by Harold MacGrath. However, the novel was not published until 1920, at least eight years after Karloff had been using the name on stage and in films. (Warner Oland played "Boris Karlov" in a film version in 1931.) Another possible influence was thought to be a character in the Edgar Rice Burroughs fantasy novel The Rider which features a "Prince Boris of Karlova", but as the novel was not published until 1915, the influence may be backward, that Burroughs saw Karloff in a play and adapted the name for the character.

One reason for the name change was to prevent embarrassment to the Pratt family. Whether or not his brothers (all dignified members of the British Foreign Service) actually considered young William the "black sheep of the family" for having become an actor, Karloff apparently worried they felt that way. He did not reunite with his family until he returned to Britain to make The Ghoul (1933), extremely worried that his siblings would disapprove of his new, macabre claim to world fame. Instead, his brothers jostled for position around him and happily posed for publicity photographs upon their reunion with him. After the photo was taken, Karloff's brothers immediately started asking about getting a copy of their own. The story of the photo became one of Karloff's favorites.

Karloff joined the Jeanne Russell Company in 1911 and performed in towns like Kamloops (British Columbia) and Prince Albert (Saskatchewan). After the devastating tornado in Regina on 30 June 1912, Karloff, who was in the midst of an engagement at the Regina Theatre, and other performers helped with clean-up efforts. He later took a job as a railway baggage handler and joined the Harry St. Clair Company that performed in Minot, North Dakota, for a year in an opera house above a hardware store.

While he was trying to establish his acting career, Karloff had to perform years of manual labour in Canada and the U.S. in order to make ends meet. Among this work, he spent one year laying track, digging ditches, shoveling coal, clearing land, and working with surveying parties for the B.C. Electric Railway Company, at the rate of $2.50 per hour. From this grueling work with the BCER and other employers, Karloff was left with back problems for the rest of his life. Because of his health, he did not serve in World War I.

During this period, Karloff worked in various theatrical stock companies across the U.S. to hone his acting skills. Some acting companies mentioned were the Harry St. Clair Players and the Billie Bennett Touring Company. By early 1918 he was working with the Maud Amber Players in Vallejo, California, but because of the Spanish flu outbreak in the San Francisco area and the fear of infection, the troupe was disbanded. He was able to find work with the Haggerty Repertory for a while (according to the 1973 obituary of Joseph Paul Haggerty, he and Boris Karloff remained lifelong friends).

Early Hollywood career 

Once Karloff arrived in Hollywood, he appeared in small roles in dozens of silent films, but the work was sporadic, and he often had to take up manual labour such as digging ditches or delivering construction plaster to make ends meet. (According to Karloff, his first film was a Frank Borzage picture at Universal for which he received $5 as an extra; the title of this film has never been traced.)

His first confirmed on-screen role was in a film serial, The Lightning Raider (1919) with Pearl White. He was in another serial that same year, The Masked Rider (1919), the earliest of his film appearances that has survived.

Karloff could also be seen in His Majesty, the American (1919) with Douglas Fairbanks, The Prince and Betty (1919), The Deadlier Sex (1920) with Blanche Sweet, and The Courage of Marge O'Doone (1920). He played an Indian in The Last of the Mohicans (1920) with Wallace Beery and he would often be cast as an Arab or Indian in his early films.

Karloff's first major role came in a film serial, The Hope Diamond Mystery (1920). He was Indian in Without Benefit of Clergy (1921) and an Arab in Cheated Hearts (1921) and villainous in The Cave Girl (1921). He was a maharajah in The Man from Downing Street (1922), a Nabob in The Infidel (1922) and had roles in The Altar Stairs (1922), Omar the Tentmaker (1922) (as an Imam), The Woman Conquers (1922), The Gentleman from America (1923), The Prisoner (1923) and the serial Riders of the Plains (1923).

Karloff did a Western, The Hellion (1923), and a drama, Dynamite Dan (1924). He could be seen in Parisian Nights (1925), Forbidden Cargo (1925), The Prairie Wife (1925) and the serial Perils of the Wild (1925).

Karloff went back to bit part status in Never the Twain Shall Meet (1925), directed by Maurice Tourneur, but he had a good support part in Lady Robinhood (1925) starring Evelyn Brent in the titular role.

Karloff went on to be in The Greater Glory (1926), Her Honor, the Governor (1926), The Bells (1926) (as a mesmerist), The Nickel-Hopper (1926) with Mabel Normand, The Golden Web (1926), The Eagle of the Sea (1926), Flames (1926), Old Ironsides (1926) with Wallace Beery and Esther Ralston, Flaming Fury (1926), Valencia (1926), The Man in the Saddle (1926) with Hoot Gibson, Tarzan and the Golden Lion (1927) (as an African), Let It Rain (1927), The Meddlin' Stranger (1927), The Princess from Hoboken (1927), The Phantom Buster (1927) with Buddy Roosevelt, and Soft Cushions (1927).

Karloff had roles in Two Arabian Knights (1927), The Love Mart (1927) with Noah Beery Sr., The Vanishing Rider (1928) (a serial), Burning the Wind (1928), Vultures of the Sea (1928), and The Little Wild Girl (1928).

He was in The Devil's Chaplain (1929), The Fatal Warning (1929) for Richard Thorpe, The Phantom of the North (1929), Two Sisters (1929), Anne Against the World (1929), Behind That Curtain (1929) with Warner Baxter, and The King of the Kongo (1929), a serial directed by Thorpe.

While one day sitting at the bus stop in the pouring rain, Lon Chaney Sr., 'The Man of a Thousand Faces', spotted Karloff and offered him a ride. Chaney told him "to find something different that will set you apart and is different from anything someone else has done or is willing to do and do it better".

Karloff had an uncredited bit part in The Unholy Night (1930) directed by Lionel Barrymore, and bigger parts in The Bad One (1930),The Sea Bat (1930) starring Charles Bickford and directed by Lionel Barrymore and Wesley Ruggles, and The Utah Kid (1930) directed by Thorpe.

A film which brought Karloff recognition was The Criminal Code (1931), a prison drama directed by Howard Hawks in which he reprised a dramatic part he had played on stage. In the same period, Karloff had a supporting role as a mob boss in Hawks' gangster film Scarface starring Paul Muni and George Raft, but the film was not released until 1932 because of difficult censorship issues.

He did another serial for Thorpe, King of the Wild (1931), then had support parts in Cracked Nuts (1931) with Wheeler and Woolsey, Young Donovan's Kid (1931) with Jackie Cooper, Smart Money (1931) with Edward G. Robinson and James Cagney in their only film together, The Public Defender (1931) with Richard Dix, I Like Your Nerve (1931) with Douglas Fairbanks Jr. and Loretta Young, and Graft (1931) with Regis Toomey and future agent Sue Carol.

Another significant role in the autumn of 1931 saw Karloff play a key supporting part as an unethical newspaper reporter in Five Star Final with Edward G. Robinson, a film about tabloid journalism which was nominated for the Academy Award for Best Picture.

He could also be seen in The Yellow Ticket (1931) with Elissa Landi, Lionel Barrymore and Laurence Olivier during Olivier's memorable first round in Hollywood, The Mad Genius (1931) with John Barrymore, The Guilty Generation (1931) with Robert Young and Tonight or Never (1931) with Gloria Swanson.

Transition to stardom 
Karloff acted in eighty-one films before being discovered by James Whale and cast in Frankenstein (1931). Karloff's role as Frankenstein's monster was physically demanding – it necessitated a bulky costume with four-inch platform boots – but the costume and extensive makeup produced an iconic image. The costume was a job in itself for Karloff with the shoes weighing  each and further aggravated his back problems. Universal Studios quickly copyrighted the makeup design for the Frankenstein monster that Jack P. Pierce had created.

It took a while for Karloff's stardom to be established with the public – he had small roles in Behind the Mask (1932), Business and Pleasure (1932) and The Miracle Man (1932).

As receipts for Frankenstein and Scarface flooded in, Universal gave Karloff third billing in Night World (1932), with Lew Ayres, Mae Clarke and George Raft.

Karloff was reunited with Whale at Universal for The Old Dark House (1932), a horror film based on the novel Benighted by J. B. Priestley, in which he finally enjoyed top billing above Melvyn Douglas, Charles Laughton, Raymond Massey and Gloria Stuart; he was billed simply as "KARLOFF", a custom that Universal continued for several years. He was loaned to MGM to play the titular role in The Mask of Fu Manchu (also 1932), for which he had top billing.

Back at Universal, he was cast as Imhotep who is revived in The Mummy (1932), an original story inspired by the unsealing of Tutankhamun's tomb—though essentially narratively a remake of Dracula set in Egypt—conceived to continue the success of the Dracula and Frankenstein adaptations. The Mummy was as successful at the box-office as his other two films and Karloff was now established as a star of horror films. Like Frankenstein, The Mummy would spawn a line of sequels, although Karloff would not reprise the iconic 1932 role.

Karloff returned to England to star in The Ghoul (1933), then made a non-horror film for John Ford, The Lost Patrol (1934), for which his performance was highly acclaimed.

Karloff was third billed in the Twentieth Century Pictures historical film The House of Rothschild (1934) with George Arliss, which was highly popular.

Horror, however, had now become Karloff's primary genre, and he gave a string of lauded performances in Universal's horror films, including several with Bela Lugosi, his main rival as heir to Lon Chaney's status as the leading horror film star. While the long-standing, creative partnership between Karloff and Lugosi never led to a close friendship, it produced some of the actors' most revered and enduring productions, beginning with The Black Cat (1934) and continuing with Gift of Gab (1934), in which both had cameos. Karloff reprised the role of Frankenstein's monster in Bride of Frankenstein (1935) for James Whale. Then he and Lugosi were reunited for The Raven (1935). Billed only by his last name during this period, Karloff had top billing above Lugosi in all their films together despite Lugosi having the larger role in The Raven.

For Columbia, Karloff made The Black Room (1935) then he returned to Universal for The Invisible Ray (1936) with Lugosi, more a science fiction film. Karloff was then cast in a Warner Bros. horror film, The Walking Dead (1936).

Because the Motion Picture Production Code (known as the Hays Code) began to be seriously enforced in 1934, horror films declined in the second half of the 1930s. Karloff worked in other genres, making two films in Britain, Juggernaut (1936) and The Man Who Changed His Mind (1936) which was released in the U.S. as The Man Who Lived Again.

He returned to Hollywood to play a supporting role in Charlie Chan at the Opera (1936), then starred in a crime drama, Night Key (1937). At Warners, he did two films with John Farrow, playing a Chinese warlord in West of Shanghai (1937) and a murder suspect in The Invisible Menace (1938).

Karloff went to Monogram to play the title role of a Chinese detective in Mr. Wong, Detective (1938), which led to a series. Karloff's portrayal of the character is an example of Hollywood's use of yellowface and its portrayal of East Asians in the earlier half of the 20th century. He had another heroic role in Devil's Island (1939).

Universal found reissuing Dracula and Frankenstein led to success at the box-office and began to produce horror films again starting with Son of Frankenstein (1939). Karloff reprised his role, with Lugosi also starring as Ygor and top-billed Basil Rathbone as Dr. Frankenstein. This was Karloff's first Universal film since the original Frankenstein in which Karloff was not top billed as "KARLOFF", a custom that the studio had used for eight films in a row while Karloff was at the height of his career. Basil Rathbone held top billing for Son of Frankenstein, and since Rathbone, Karloff and Lugosi were all billed above the title, billing Basil, Boris and Bela was hard to resist. Karloff was never billed by simply his last name again. Regarding Son of Frankenstein, the film's director Rowland V. Lee said  his crew let Lugosi "work on the characterization; the interpretation he gave us was imaginative and totally unexpected ... when we finished shooting, there was no doubt in anyone's mind that he stole the show. Karloff's monster was weak by comparison."

After The Mystery of Mr. Wong (1939) and Mr. Wong in Chinatown (1939) he signed a three-picture deal with Columbia, starting with The Man They Could Not Hang (1939). Karloff returned to Universal to make Tower of London (1939) with Rathbone, playing the murderous henchman of King Richard III.

Karloff made a fourth Mr Wong film at Monogram The Fatal Hour (1940). At Warners he was in British Intelligence (1940), then he went to Universal to do Black Friday (1940) with Lugosi.

Karloff's second and third films for Columbia were The Man with Nine Lives (1940) and Before I Hang (1940). In between he did a fifth and final Mr Wong film, Doomed to Die (1940).

Karloff appeared at a celebrity baseball game as Frankenstein's monster in 1940, hitting a gag home run and making catcher Buster Keaton fall into an acrobatic dead faint as the monster stomped into home plate.

Karloff finished a six picture commitment with Monogram with The Ape (1940). He and Lugosi appeared with Peter Lorre in a comedy at RKO, You'll Find Out (1941), then he went to Columbia for The Devil Commands (1941) and The Boogie Man Will Get You (1941).

Professional expansion and further success
An enthusiastic performer, he returned to the Broadway stage in the original production of Arsenic and Old Lace in 1941, in which he played a homicidal gangster enraged to be frequently mistaken for Karloff. Frank Capra cast Raymond Massey in the 1944 film, which was shot in 1941, while Karloff was still appearing in the role on Broadway. The play's producers allowed the film to be made conditionally: it was not to be released until the production closed. (Karloff reprised his role on television in the anthology series The Best of Broadway (1955), and with Tony Randall and Tom Bosley in a 1962 production on the Hallmark Hall of Fame. He also starred in a radio adaptation produced by Screen Guild Theatre in 1946.)

In 1944, he underwent a spinal operation to relieve a chronic arthritic condition.

Karloff returned to film roles in The Climax (1944), an unsuccessful attempt to repeat the success of Phantom of the Opera (1943). More liked was House of Frankenstein (1944), marking Karloff's "retirement" from playing the Monster, where instead, he comes full circle to play the villainous Dr. Niemann, a mad scientist fixated on life-experiments much like Henry Frankenstein, and pass the torch to actor Glenn Strange, who would play the Monster in subsequent films.

Karloff made three films for producer Val Lewton at RKO: The Body Snatcher (1945), his last teaming with Lugosi, Isle of the Dead (1945) and Bedlam (1946).

In a 1946 interview with Louis Berg of the Los Angeles Times, Karloff discussed his arrangement with RKO, working with Lewton and his reasons for leaving Universal. Karloff left Universal because he thought the Frankenstein franchise had run its course; the entries in the series after Son of Frankenstein were B-pictures. Berg wrote that the last installment in which Karloff appeared—House of Frankenstein—was what he called a " 'monster clambake,' with everything thrown in—Frankenstein, Dracula, a hunchback and a 'man-beast' that howled in the night. It was too much. Karloff thought it was ridiculous and said so." Berg explained that the actor had "great love and respect for" Lewton, who was "the man who rescued him from the living dead and restored, so to speak, his soul."

Horror films experienced a decline in popularity after the war, and Karloff found himself working in other genres.

For the Danny Kaye comedy, The Secret Life of Walter Mitty (1947), Karloff appeared in a brief but starring role as Dr. Hugo Hollingshead, a psychiatrist. Director Norman Z. McLeod shot a sequence with Karloff in the Frankenstein monster make-up, but it was deleted from the finished film.

Karloff appeared in a film noir, Lured (1947), and as an Indian in Unconquered (1947). He had support roles in Dick Tracy Meets Gruesome (1947), Tap Roots (1948), and Abbott and Costello Meet the Killer, Boris Karloff (1949).

During this period, Karloff was a frequent guest on radio programmes, whether it was starring in Arch Oboler's Chicago-based Lights Out productions (including the episode "Cat Wife") or spoofing his horror image with Fred Allen or Jack Benny. In 1949, he was the host and star of Starring Boris Karloff, a radio and television anthology series for the ABC broadcasting network.

He appeared as the villainous Captain Hook in Peter Pan in a 1950 stage musical adaptation which also featured Jean Arthur.

Karloff returned to horror films with The Strange Door (1951) and The Black Castle (1952).

He was nominated for a Tony Award for his work opposite Julie Harris in The Lark, by the French playwright Jean Anouilh, about Joan of Arc, which he reprised years later on TV's Hallmark Hall of Fame.

During the 1950s, he appeared on British television in the series Colonel March of Scotland Yard, in which he portrayed John Dickson Carr's fictional detective Colonel March, who was known for solving apparently impossible crimes. Christopher Lee appeared alongside Karloff in the episode "At Night, All Cats are Grey" broadcast in 1955. A little later, Karloff co-starred with Lee in the film Corridors of Blood (1958).

Karloff appeared in Abbott and Costello Meet Dr. Jekyll and Mr. Hyde (1952) and visited Italy for The Island Monster (1954) and then returned to Hollywood to appear in Sabaka (1954).

Karloff, along with H. V. Kaltenborn, was a regular panelist on the NBC game show, Who Said That? which aired between 1948 and 1955. Later, as a guest on NBC's The Gisele MacKenzie Show, Karloff sang "Those Were the Good Old Days" from Damn Yankees while Gisele MacKenzie performed the solo, "Give Me the Simple Life". On The Red Skelton Show, Karloff guest starred along with actor Vincent Price in a parody of Frankenstein, with Red Skelton as "Klem Kadiddle Monster". He served as host and one of the stars of the anthology series The Veil (1958), a 12-episode Hal Roach TV series which was never broadcast at all due to financial problems at the producing studio; the complete series was later rediscovered in the 1990s and eventually released on DVD.

Karloff made some horror films in the late 1950s: Voodoo Island (1957), The Haunted Strangler (1958), Frankenstein 1970 (1958) (this time as the Baron), and Corridors of Blood (1958).  Karloff donned the Frankenstein Monster make-up for the last time in 1962 for a Halloween episode of the TV series Route 66, which also featured Peter Lorre and Lon Chaney, Jr.

During this period, he hosted and acted in a number of television series, including Thriller and Britain's Out of This World.

Final roles and work 

Karloff went to Italy to appear in Black Sabbath (1963) directed by Mario Bava. He made The Raven (1963) for Roger Corman and American International Pictures (AIP). When The Raven had successfully wrapped shooting with time left in Karloff's contract, Corman conscribed a new story with the same sets to feature Karloff in The Terror (1963), with Jack Nicholson in the leading role and Karloff playing a baron who murdered his wife. He made a cameo in AIP's Bikini Beach (1964) and had a bigger role in that studio's The Comedy of Terrors (1964), directed by Jacques Tourneur, and travelled to England to make Die, Monster, Die! (1965) co-starring Nick Adams.  British actress Suzan Farmer, who played his daughter in the film, later recalled Karloff was aloof during production "and wasn't the charming personality people perceived him to be", probably because he was in such intense pain in the 1960s.

In 1966, Karloff also appeared with Robert Vaughn and Stefanie Powers in the spy series The Girl from U.N.C.L.E., in the episode "The Mother Muffin Affair", Karloff performing in drag as the titular character. That same year, he also played an Indian Maharajah on the installment of the adventure series The Wild Wild West titled "The Night of the Golden Cobra". Karloff's last film for AIP was The Ghost in the Invisible Bikini (1966).

In 1967, he played an eccentric Spanish professor who believes himself to be Don Quixote in a whimsical episode of I Spy titled "Mainly on the Plains", which he filmed in Spain. Cauldron of Blood, shot in Spain around the same time, and co-starring Viveca Lindfors, was only released in 1970 after Karloff's death.

In the mid-1960s, he enjoyed a late-career surge in the United States when he narrated the made-for-television animated film of Dr. Seuss' How the Grinch Stole Christmas, and also provided the voice of the Grinch, although the song "You're a Mean One, Mr. Grinch" was sung by the American voice actor Thurl Ravenscroft. The film was first broadcast on CBS-TV in 1966. Karloff later received a Grammy Award for "Best Recording For Children" after the recording was commercially released. Because Ravenscroft (who never met Karloff in the course of their work on the show) was uncredited for his contribution to How the Grinch Stole Christmas!, his performance of the song was at times misattributed to Karloff.

He appeared in Mad Monster Party? (1967) and went to England to star in the second feature film of the British director Michael Reeves, The Sorcerers (1967).

Karloff starred in Targets (1968), the first feature film directed by Peter Bogdanovich, featuring two separate plotlines that converge into one. In one, a disturbed young man kills his family, then embarks on a killing spree. In the other, a famous horror-film actor confirms his retirement, agreeing to one last appearance at a drive-in cinema. Karloff starred as the retired horror film actor, Byron Orlok, a thinly disguised version of himself; Orlok (named both for Karloff himself and Count Orlok,) was facing an end of life crisis, which he resolves through a confrontation with the crazed gunman at the drive-in cinema.

Around the same time, he played the occult expert Professor Marsh in a British production titled The Crimson Cult (Curse of the Crimson Altar, also 1968), which was the last Karloff film to be released during his lifetime.

He ended his career by appearing in four low-budget Mexican horror films: Isle of the Snake People, The Incredible Invasion, Fear Chamber and House of Evil. This was a package deal with Mexican producer Luis Enrique Vergara. Karloff's scenes for all four films were directed by Jack Hill and shot back-to-back within one month in Los Angeles in the spring of 1968. The films were later completed in Mexico and theatrically released in the early 1970s. Karloff was originally slated to travel to Mexico to shoot the films, but he had emphysema and crippling arthritis. Only half of one lung was still functioning and he required oxygen between takes, so Hill arranged for Karloff to film his scenes in California.

Due to the unexpected sudden death of the producer Vergara, all four Mexican films were embroiled for a while in legal actions and were only released posthumously in 1971, with the last, The Incredible Invasion, not released until 1972, more than two years after Karloff's death.

Spoken word recordings and horror anthologies
He recorded the title role of Shakespeare's Cymbeline for the Shakespeare Recording Society (Caedmon Audio 1962). He also recorded the narration for Sergei Prokofiev's Peter and the Wolf with the Vienna State Opera Orchestra under Mario Rossi.

Records he made for the children's market included Three Little Pigs and Other Fairy Stories, Tales of the Frightened (volume 1 and 2), Rudyard Kipling's Just So Stories and, with Cyril Ritchard and Celeste Holm, Mother Goose Nursery Rhymes, and Lewis Carroll's The Hunting of the Snark.

Karloff was credited for editing several horror anthologies, commencing with Tales of Terror (Cleveland and NY: World Publishing Co, 1943) (compiled with the help of Edmond Speare). This wartime-published anthology went through at least five printings to September 1945. It has been reprinted recently (Orange NJ: Idea Men, 2007). Karloff's name was also attached to And the Darkness Falls (Cleveland and NY: World Publishing Co, 1946); and The Boris Karloff Horror Anthology (London: Souvenir Press, 1965; simultaneous publication in Canada - Toronto: The Ryerson Press; US pbk reprint NY: Avon Books, 1965 retitled as Boris Karloff's Favourite Horror Stories; UK pbk reprints London: Corgi, 1969 and London: Everest, 1975, both under the original title), though it is less clear whether Karloff himself actually edited these.

Tales of the Frightened (Belmont Books, 1963), though based on the recordings by Karloff of the same title, and featuring his image on the book cover, contained stories written by Michael Avallone; the second volume, More Tales of the Frightened, contained stories authored by Robert Lory. Both Avallone and Lory worked closely with Canadian editor and book packager Lyle Kenyon Engel, who also ghost-edited a horror story anthology for horror film star Basil Rathbone.

Personal life
Karloff married six times. His wives included stage actress Grace Harding (married from 1910 to 1913), actress Olive de Wilton (from 1916 to 1919), musician Montana Laurena Williams (from 1920 to 1922) and actress Helen Vivian Soule (from 1924 to 1928).

His fifth marriage to Dorothy Stine lasted from 1930 until 1946. This marriage resulted in Karloff's only child, daughter Sara Karloff, being born on November 23, 1938 (which coincidentally was also Karloff's 51st birthday).

His sixth and final marriage, to Evelyn Hope Helmore, was in April 1946, immediately after his fifth divorce. They were still happily married 23 years later at the time of his death.

In 1958, Karloff's niece Diana Bromley was arrested and charged with murdering her two small children with a razor in Haslemere, England, then attempting to slash her own throat. She was the daughter of Karloff's brother Sir John Thomas Pratt.

Beginning in 1940, Karloff dressed as Father Christmas every Christmas to hand out presents to physically disabled children in a Baltimore hospital.

He never legally changed his name to "Boris Karloff." He signed official documents "William H. Pratt, a.k.a. Boris Karloff."

He was a charter member of the Screen Actors Guild, and he was especially outspoken due to the long hours he spent in makeup while playing Frankenstein's Monster and the Mummy.   He was an early member of the Hollywood Cricket Club.

Death
Upon returning to England to live in 1959, his address was 43 Cadogan Square, London. In 1966, he bought 25 Campden House (in 29 Sheffield Terrace), Kensington W8, and Roundabout Cottage in the Hampshire village of Bramshott. A longtime heavy smoker, he had emphysema which left him with only half of one lung still functioning. He contracted bronchitis in late 1968 and was hospitalised at University College Hospital. He died of pneumonia at the King Edward VII Hospital, Midhurst, in Sussex, on 2 February 1969, at the age of 81.

His body was cremated following a requested modest service at Guildford Crematorium, Godalming, Surrey, where he is commemorated by a plaque in the Garden of Remembrance. A memorial service was held at St Paul's, Covent Garden (the Actors' Church), London, where there is also a plaque.

Legacy
During the run of Thriller, Karloff lent his name and likeness to a comic book for Gold Key Comics based upon the series. After Thriller was cancelled, the comic was retitled Boris Karloff's Tales of Mystery. An illustrated likeness of Karloff continued to introduce each issue of this publication for more than a decade after his death (he wasn't involved however in writing or drawing the stories); the comic book lasted until the early 1980s (a Gold Key comic book series based upon The Twilight Zone that ran concurrently with Karloff's did the same thing with host Rod Serling's likeness after his death). In 2009, Dark Horse Comics began publishing reprints of Boris Karloff's Tales of Mystery in a hardcover edition.

For his contribution to film and television, Boris Karloff was awarded two stars on the Hollywood Walk of Fame, at 1737 Vine Street for motion pictures, and 6664 Hollywood Boulevard for television. Karloff was featured by the U.S. Postal Service as Frankenstein's Monster and the Mummy in its series "Classic Monster Movie Stamps" issued in September 1997. In 1998, an English Heritage blue plaque was unveiled in his hometown in London. The British film magazine Empire in 2016 ranked Karloff's portrayal as Frankenstein's monster the sixth-greatest horror movie character of all time.

Filmography

Radio appearances (1932-1968)

Appearances on Lights Out! 
Karloff acted in 7 episodes of the Lights Out! NBC anthology radio series from 1938 to 1947:
"The Dream"  (March 23, 1938)	
"Valse Triste"	(March 30, 1938)
"Cat Wife" by Arch Oboler  (April 6, 1938)
"Three Matches"  (April 13, 1938)
"Night on the Mountain"  (April 20, 1938)
"Death Robbery"  (July 16, 1947)
"The Ring"  (July 30, 1947)

Appearances on Inner Sanctum 
Karloff acted in 22 episodes of the Inner Sanctum ABC anthology radio series from 1941 to 1952:
"The Man of Steel" (Mar. 16, 1941)
"The Man Who Hated Death" (Mar. 23, 1941)
"Death in the Zoo" (Apr. 6, 1941)
"Fog" (Apr. 20, 1941)
"Imperfect Crime" (May 11, 1941)
"Fall of the House of Usher" (June 1, 1941)
"Green-Eyed Bat" (June 22, 1941)
"The Man who Painted Death" (June 29, 1941)
"Death is a Murderer" (July 13, 1941)
"The Tell-Tale Heart" (Aug. 3, 1941)
"Terror on Bailey street" (Oct. 26, 1941)
"Fall of the House of Usher" (Apr. 5, 1942) may be a rerun
"Blackstone" (Apr. 19, 1942)
"Study for Murder" (May 3, 1942)
"The Cone" (May 24, 1942)
"Death Wears my Face" (May 31, 1942)
"Strange Bequest" (June 7, 1942)
"The Grey Wolf" (June 21, 1942)
"Corridor of Doom" (Oct. 23, 1945)
"The Wailing Wall" (Nov. 6, 1945)
"Birdsong for a Murderer" (June 22, 1952) 
"Death for sale" (July 13, 1952)

Appearances on Creeps By Night 
Karloff acted in ten episodes on this 1944 radio anthology series
"The Voice of Death" (Feb. 15, 1944)
"The Man With the Devil's Hands" (Feb. 22, 1944)
 Unknown title (Mar. 7, 1944)
"Dark Destiny" (Mar. 14, 1944)
 Unknown title (Mar. 21, 1944)
"The String of Pearls" (Mar. 28, 1944)
 Unknown title (April 18, 1944)
 Unknown title (April 25, 1944)
"The Final Reckoning" (May 2, 1944)
"The Hunt" (May 9, 1944)

Appearances on Starring Boris Karloff 
Karloff acted in 13 episodes of the "Starring Boris Karloff" anthology TV/ radio series in 1949: this show was broadcast as both a TV show and a radio show simultaneously

"Five Golden Guineas" (Sept. 21, 1949)
"The Mask" (Sept. 28, 1949)
"Mungahara" (Oct. 5, 1949)
"Mad Illusion" (Oct. 12, 1949)
"Perchance To Dream" (Oct. 19, 1949)
"The Devil Takes a Bride" (Oct. 26, 1949)
"The Moving Finger" (Nov. 2, 1949)
"The Twisted Path" (Nov. 9, 1949)
"False Face" (Nov. 16, 1949)
"Cranky Bill" (Nov. 23, 1949)
"Three O'Clock" (Nov. 30, 1949)
"The Shop at Sly Corner" (Dec. 7, 1949)
"The Night Reveals" (Dec. 14, 1949)

See also 
 Grammy Award for Best Album for Children
 Karloff, 2014 one-man play by Randy Bowser.

References

External links

 
 
 
 Karloff's birthplace
 Vertlieb's Views: Boris Karloff
 Literature on Boris Karloff
 Lights Out: Cat Wife (NBC, 6 April 1938)—Karloff's performance in the radio horror classic
 Correspondence between Sir John Pratt and William Henry Pratt is held by SOAS Special Collections.
 Boris Karloff: The Man Behind The Monster Documentary film about Boris Karloff's life, career and legacy.

 
1887 births
1969 deaths
20th-century English male actors
Alumni of King's College London
Audiobook narrators
British expatriate male actors in the United States
Caedmon Records artists
Deaths from emphysema
Deaths from pneumonia in England
English Anglicans
English male film actors
English male radio actors
English male silent film actors
English male stage actors
English male voice actors
People from Dulwich
English people of Indian descent
Grammy Award winners
Male actors from London
People educated at Enfield Grammar School
People educated at Merchant Taylors' School, Northwood
People educated at Uppingham School
People from Enfield, London
British people of Anglo-Indian descent
RKO Pictures contract players
People from Bramshott
Universal Pictures contract players